Josh Hope may refer to:

 Josh Hope (Emmerdale)
 Josh Hope (soccer) (born 1998), Australian footballer